24s may refer to:

Music
 "24's", a single by rapper T.I.
 "24's (RichGirl song), a single by RichGirl

Other
 24S, an online fashion company
 24s, the FAA identifier for Pinehurst State Airport in Jackson County, Oregon, USA